Baden is a railway station serving the town of Baden in Lower Austria. The terminus of the Wiener Lokalbahn is located nearby the station.

The composer Karel Komzák II died after attempting to jump onto a departing train at the station in 1905.

References 

Railway stations in Lower Austria
Austrian Federal Railways